The Halfway House at 3951 Montana Highway 78 near Columbus, Montana is an American Four-Square house built in 1907.  It was listed on the National Register of Historic Places in 2002.

The property included three contributing buildings and one other contributing element, an irrigation ditch.

Its name is derived from the fact that it is midway between Columbus and Absarokee, Montana.

References

Houses on the National Register of Historic Places in Montana
Houses completed in 1907
Houses in Stillwater County, Montana
American Foursquare architecture
National Register of Historic Places in Stillwater County, Montana